Malura is a surname. Notable people with the surname include:

Dennis Malura (born 1984), German footballer, son of Edmund
Edmund Malura (born 1955), German footballer and manager
Pavel Malura (born 1970), Czech football manager